The Kensington Valley Pounders was a semi-professional ice hockey team in the North Eastern Hockey League. The team was based in Brighton, Michigan in the greater Detroit metropolitan area, and was temporarily known as the Detroit Pounders before adopting the Kensington Valley moniker. The Pounders played home games at the Kensington Valley Ice House. 

The Pounders were relocated from Danville, Illinois after the 2006-07 season.

External links
Official team website

Livingston County, Michigan
Ice hockey teams in Michigan